Indapyrophenidone is a synthetic drug of the cathinone class that has been sold online as a designer drug.

The substance is the  indanyl-α-phenyl analogue of the stimulant drug α-PVP, however it is also structurally related to diarylethylamines such as fluorolintane and UWA-001. Its mechanism of action is unknown.

See also 
 βk-Ephenidine
 Diphenidine
 Ephenidine
 Lefetamine
 Methoxphenidine
 Pyrovalerone
 TH-PVP

References 

Designer drugs
Diarylethylamines
Drugs with unknown mechanisms of action
Pyrrolidinophenones
Stimulants